Gliese 752 is a binary star system in the Aquila constellation. This system is relatively nearby, at a distance of about 19 light years.

The Gliese 752 system consists of two M-type stars. The primary star is the magnitude 9 Gliese (GJ) 752 A. The secondary star is the dim magnitude 17 Gliese (GJ) 752 B, more commonly referred to as VB 10. This stellar pair form a binary star system separated by about 74 arc seconds (~434 AU). This system is also known for its high proper motion of about 1 arc second a year.  Component A has one known exoplanet.

The name and number are from the Catalogue of Nearby Stars, published by German astronomer Wilhelm Gliese in 1969.

Interior dynamics of the Gliese 752 stars

Before the Hubble Space Telescope observation of Gliese 752 system, astronomers thought magnetic fields in stars required the same dynamo process that creates magnetic fields on the Sun. In the classic solar model heat generated by nuclear fusion reactions at the star's center escapes through a radiative zone just outside the core. The heat travels from the radiative core to the star's surface through a convection zone. In this region, heat bubbles to the surface by motions similar to boiling in a pot of water.

Dynamos, which accelerate electrons to create magnetic forces, operate when the interior of a star rotates faster than its surface. Recent studies of the Sun indicate its convection zone rotates at nearly the same rate at all depths. This means the solar dynamo must operate in the more rapidly rotating radiative core just below the convective zone.

Gliese 752 A characteristics 
The primary star, also known as Wolf 1055, is a type M2.5 red dwarf with about half the size and mass as the Sun and considerably cooler at 3354 K. This star was first observed to be a high proper motion star by the German astronomer Max Wolf with his pioneering use of astrophotography. He added this star to his extensive catalog of such stars in 1919. It is a variable star with the variable star catalog name V1428 Aquilae.  It is a BY Draconis type variable star subject to flare events.

Planetary system
In August 2018, a group of scientist using measurements taken from the CARMENES spectrograph, on the Calar Alto Observatory located in Spain, announced they had detected a planet orbiting the larger of the stars, HD 180617 (Gliese 752 A). The measurements indicated the presence of a planet with a minimum mass comparable to Neptune on an orbit partly located within the habitable zone.

Gliese 752 B characteristics 

Gliese 752 was not known to be a binary star system until the discovery of a small dim secondary star by George Van Biesbroeck in 1944. This star is identified as VB 10 in  Van Biesbroeck's star catalog. This star is notable for its very low mass. At .08 solar mass it is near the lower mass limit for a star. It is also quite small at 10% of the solar radius.

This star is a type M8V red dwarf. This star is also known for its very low luminosity, with an absolute magnitude of nearly 19, due to its very cool surface temperature of only 2600°K. It is a variable star with the variable star catalog name V1298 Aquilae. This star is a UV Ceti type variable star also subject to flare events. It shares the large proper motion, along with the tendency to flare, with the primary star.

In 2009, the discovery of the extrasolar planet, VB 10b, was announced in orbit around this star. However a subsequent spectrographic survey failed to confirm the presence of any large planets in orbit around this star.

See also 
 Binary star
 List of least massive stars

Notes

References

External links 

Aquila (constellation)
094761
M-type main-sequence stars
Flare stars
180617
0752
Binary stars
Planetary systems with one confirmed planet
Durchmusterung objects
Aquilae, V1428/V1298
BY Draconis variables